Lester LeFevre Cecil (November 21, 1893 – November 26, 1982) was a United States circuit judge of the United States Court of Appeals for the Sixth Circuit and previously was a United States district judge of the United States District Court for the Southern District of Ohio.

Education and career

Born in Miami County, Ohio, Cecil received a Bachelor of Laws from the University of Michigan Law School in 1917. He was in private practice in Dayton, Ohio from 1917 to 1922, interrupted briefly by his service as a Sergeant in the United States Army during World War I, in 1918. He was prosecuting attorney for Dayton from 1922 to 1925. He was a Judge of the Municipal Court of Dayton from 1926 to 1929, and of the Montgomery County Court of Common Pleas from 1929 to 1953.

Federal judicial service

Cecil was nominated by President Dwight D. Eisenhower on April 1, 1953, to a seat on the United States District Court for the Southern District of Ohio vacated by Judge Robert Reasoner Nevin. He was confirmed by the United States Senate on April 23, 1953, and received his commission the same day. His service terminated on July 28, 1959, due to his elevation to the Sixth Circuit.

Cecil was nominated by President Eisenhower on February 17, 1959, to a seat on the United States Court of Appeals for the Sixth Circuit vacated by Judge Potter Stewart. He was confirmed by the Senate on July 15, 1959, and received his commission on July 18, 1959. He served as Chief Judge and as a member of the Judicial Conference of the United States from 1962 to 1963. He assumed senior status on August 1, 1965. His service terminated on November 26, 1982, due to his death.

References

External links
 
 Lester L. Cecil Lincoln Collection, Special Collections and Archives, Wright State University

1893 births
1982 deaths
Ohio state court judges
Judges of the United States District Court for the Southern District of Ohio
United States district court judges appointed by Dwight D. Eisenhower
Judges of the United States Court of Appeals for the Sixth Circuit
United States court of appeals judges appointed by Dwight D. Eisenhower
20th-century American judges
University of Michigan Law School alumni
People from Miami County, Ohio
Politicians from Dayton, Ohio
United States Army soldiers
United States Army personnel of World War I